Make Your Move (formerly called Cobu 3D, also known as Make Your Move 3D), is a 2013 independent dance film starring K-pop singer BoA and ballroom dancer Derek Hough. The film was directed by Duane Adler, who wrote the script for Save the Last Dance (2001) and Step Up (2006). Hough took season twelve off of the show Dancing with the Stars to star in the film, which was shot in New York City and Toronto during the spring of 2011. Aside from the lead stars, singer Yunho from TVXQ has a cameo appearance. The film was choreographed by Tabitha and Napoleon D'umo, Yako Miyamoto, and Nick Gonzalez.

A preview of the film was shown at KCON 2012, a Korean entertainment convention, in Irvine, California. Songs from the movie's soundtrack were played at the convention as well including three by the groups Girls' Generation, F(x) and TVXQ.

The film was released in 2013. According to IMDb, it was released in Norway, Italy, Belgium, the Netherlands, and Denmark in the summer. It was released in the United Arab Emirates, South Korea, and the United States in 2014.

Cast
 Derek Hough as Donny
 BoA as Aya
 Will Yun Lee as Kaz
 Wesley Jonathan as Nick
 Izabella Miko as Tatiana
 Jefferson Brown as Michael
 Miki Ishikawa as Natsumi
 Dan Lauria as Parole Officer Foster
 Rick Gonzalez as Rene
 Michael Mando as Raphael
 Yunho as Yunho (cameo)

Reception
Make Your Move has received mixed reviews from critics. , the film holds a 38% approval rating on review aggregator Rotten Tomatoes, based on 16 reviews with an average rating of 4.76/10. Metacritic calculated a score of 40 out of 100 based on 9 reviews, which signifies mixed or average reviews.

Sara Stewart of the New York Post gave the film one out of four stars, saying "The dancing's fine here, but there's little else to distinguish Make Your Move, an entirely generic drama in which two characters actually say to one another, 'What if this doesn't work?' 'It has to.' It doesn't."

Inkoo Kang of the Los Angeles Times said "[Make Your Move]'s core dance styles are a wonderfully frenetic fusion of tap and hip-hop and a truly novel blend of Japanese taiko drumming and K-pop girl-group choreography. Whenever actor Derek Hough and BoA stop leaping and twirling, though, Make Your Move is an underwritten mess."

Frank Scheck of The Hollywood Reporter said "Undemanding young audiences will hardly mind the one-note characterizations, formulaic storyline and banal dialogue even as they'll relate to the frequent nods to text messaging and YouTube videos gone viral... Hough's dancing is far more impressive than his acting, and BoA, despite her perky sexiness, is an even less compelling screen presence. But they certainly move well together, and that's pretty much all that matters here..."

Stephanie Merry of The Washington Post said "Although the bit of bedroom footwork was more laugh-inducing than anything, some of the dancing really is spectacular. Scenes from the competing clubs include impressive choreography and gravity-defying moves. If only the poorly delivered, trite dialogue and predictable plot aimed as high."

Soundtrack

References

External links

 
 
 
 
 
 

2013 films
American dance films
South Korean musical films
Films about Korean Americans
2010s English-language films
Films about interracial romance
Films set in Brooklyn
Films set in New York City
Films set in New Orleans
Films based on Romeo and Juliet
2010s American films
2010s South Korean films